Rex Alan Collinge  (born 23 April 1935) is an English former first-class cricketer and Royal Air Force officer. Collinge served in the Royal Air Force from 1954 to 1985, rising to the rank of wing commander and being made an MBE in the 1979 Birthday Honours. He also played first-class cricket for the Combined Services cricket team.

Life and career
Collinge was born at Nottingham. He was educated at Bedford School, where he played for the school cricket team in 1951–52. His batting was described in 1951 as showing "much promise". After completing his education, Collinge carried out his National Service in the Royal Air Force, with him being commissioned as a pilot officer in 1954. He relinquished his commission on the National Service List when he was appointed to a short service commission in September 1955.

He debuted in minor counties cricket for Suffolk in 1955, an association he would maintain until 1962, having made twelve appearances in the Minor Counties Championship. He was promoted to the rank of flying officer in June 1956, with promotion to flight lieutenant coming in April 1960. He made his debut in first-class cricket for the Combined Services cricket team against Cambridge University at Fenner's in 1962, taking a five wicket haul on debut when he took 6 for 52 in the Cambridge first-innings. He made a further first-class appearance for the Combined Services in 1962, against Ireland at Belfast. He scored a total of 101 runs in these matches, with a high score of 41, while with the ball he took 11 wickets at an average of 16.90.

He was promoted to the rank of squadron leader in July 1969. He was mentioned in dispatches in December 1973 for his service in Northern Ireland. He was made an MBE in the 1979 Birthday Honours. He was promoted to the rank of wing commander the following month. Collinge retired from active service at his own request in July 1985.

References

External links

1935 births
Living people
Cricketers from Nottingham
Military personnel from Nottingham
People educated at Bedford School
Royal Air Force officers
Royal Air Force Regiment officers
English cricketers
Suffolk cricketers
Combined Services cricketers
Members of the Order of the British Empire